Shobi Paulraj is an Indian choreographer in the Kollywood and Tollywood industry. Founder of IBO Dance Studio, he has also choreographed in Bollywood movie, Holiday: A Soldier Is Never Off Duty, starring Akshay Kumar and Sonakshi Sinha 

Filmography
Choreographer

 2004 Arul 2005 Thirupaachi 2005 Sachein 2005 Aaru 2005 Sivakasi 2006 Aathi 2007 Azhagiya Tamil Magan 
 2008 Sakkarakatti 2008 Kuruvi 2009 TN 07 AL 4777 2009 Vettaikaaran 2009 Aadhavan 2010 Singam 2011 Mankatha 2011 7aum Arivu 2011 Velayudham 2012 Nanban 2012 Thuppakki 2013 Pandiya Naadu 2013 Arrambam 2014 Holiday: A Soldier Is Never Off Duty 2014 Kaththi 2014 Lingaa 2014 Jeeva 2015 I 2015 Paayum Puli 2015 Massu Engira Masilamani 2015 Uttama Villain 2015 Vedalam 2016 Iru Mugan 2016 Theri 2017 Spyder 2017 Si3 2017 Mersal 2017 Velaikkaran 
 2018 Sarkar 2018 Dev 2019 Namma Veettu Pillai 2019 Kaappaan 2019 Bigil 2020 Darbar 2020 Soorarai Pottru 2021 Eeswaran 2021 Pushpa: The Rise 2022 Don 2022 Prince 2022 Sardar 2023 VarisuAwards and Nominations
 Won
 2009 Vijay Award for Best Choreographer - TN 07 AL 4777 2013 Tamil Nadu State Film Award for Best Choreographer -Pandiya Naadu 2012 Ananda Vikatan Cinema Award for Best Choreographer - Thuppakki 2014 Filmfare Award for Best Dance Choreographer – South - Kaththi 2014 Ananda Vikatan Cinema Award for Best Choreographer - Kaththi 2014 Edison Award for Best Choreographer - Kaththi 2014 Vijay Award for Best Choreographer - Jeeva 2017 Edison Award for Best Choreographer - Mersal, Velaikkaran 2019 Ananda Vikatan Cinema Award for Best Choreographer - BigilNominated 
 2008 Vijay Award for Best Choreographer - Sakkarakatti 2009 Vijay Award for Best Choreographer - Aadhavan 2012 Vijay Award for Best Choreographer - Thuppakki''

References

External links
 

Indian film choreographers
Living people
Tamil cinema
Artists from Chennai
Filmfare Awards winners
Dancers from Tamil Nadu
21st-century Indian dancers
Year of birth missing (living people)